In algebra, Serre's criterion for normality, introduced by Jean-Pierre Serre, gives necessary and sufficient conditions for a commutative Noetherian ring A to be a normal ring. The criterion involves the following two conditions for A:
 is a regular local ring for any prime ideal  of height ≤ k.
 for any prime ideal .
The statement is:
A is a reduced ring  hold.
A is a normal ring  hold.
A is a Cohen–Macaulay ring  hold for all k.
Items 1, 3 trivially follow from the definitions. Item 2 is much deeper.

For an integral domain, the criterion is due to Krull. The general case is due to Serre.

Proof

Sufficiency
(After EGA IV. Theorem 5.8.6.)

Suppose A satisfies S2 and R1. Then A in particular satisfies S1 and R0; hence, it is reduced. If  are the minimal prime ideals of A, then the total ring of fractions K of A is the direct product of the residue fields : see total ring of fractions of a reduced ring. Now, if A is integrally closed in K, then each  is integral over A and so is in A; consequently, A is a direct product of integrally closed domains Aei's and we are done. Thus, it is enough to show that A is integrally closed in K.

For this end, suppose

where all f, g, ai's are in A and g is moreover a non-zerodivisor. We want to show:
.
Now, the condition S2 says that  is unmixed of height one; i.e., each associated primes  of  has height one. However,  is associated to the zero ideal in  so it can only contain zero divisors, see here. By the condition R1, the localization  is integrally closed and so , where  is the localization map, since the integral equation persists after localization. Hence, the assertion holds.

Necessity
Suppose A is a normal ring. Replacing A by a localization, we can assume A is a local ring with maximal ideal . Put y = g/f in the total ring of fractions. If , then  is a faithful -module and is a finitely generated A-module; consequently,  is integral over A and thus in A, a contradiction.

For R1, we argue in the same way: let  be a prime ideal of height one. Localizing at  we assume  is a maximal ideal and the similar argument as above shows that  is in fact principal. Thus, A is a regular local ring.

Notes

References 

H. Matsumura, Commutative algebra, 1970.

Theorems in ring theory